Vadym Serhiyovych Boychenko (born 5 June 1977) is a Ukrainian politician who de jure serves as the mayor of Mariupol in Donetsk Oblast, Ukraine. Boychenko served as mayor during the 2022 Russian invasion of Ukraine and Siege of Mariupol, during which the city has been "completely destroyed", according to President Volodymyr Zelenskyy.

Early life
Boychenko was born in Mariupol on 5 June 1977. He is a graduate of both the Priazov State Technical University and the Donetsk National University. He began employment at the Azovstal Iron and Steel Works as a locomotive engineer in 2005, going on to become Deputy Head of Transportation before leaving the company in 2010. He then held management positions at Metinvest and another steelworks company until his election as mayor in 2015.

Mayor of Mariupol
In 2013–2015, Boychenko was a member of the Executive Committee of the Mariupol City Council.

Boychenko was elected mayor of Mariupol on 15 December 2015. He was elected as a non-partisan self-nominated candidate with 69% of the vote.

Boychenko unsuccessfully took part in the 2019 Ukrainian parliamentary election for the Opposition Bloc party, No. 5 on the list as a non-partisan. The party won six single-seat constituencies, but its nationwide list only won 3.23% of the votes, failing to overcome the 5% election barrier.

Boychenko was re-elected for a second term in October 2020. He was a candidate for the Vadym Boychenko Bloc.

Siege of Mariupol

During the 2022 Russian invasion of Ukraine, Boychenko left the city and provided regular updates to the outside world concerning the Siege of Mariupol from Dnipro and Zaporizhzhia.

See also
 List of mayors of Mariupol

Notes

References

Living people
1977 births
Politicians from Mariupol
Mayors of places in Ukraine
Pryazovskyi State Technical University alumni
Donetsk National University alumni
Siege of Mariupol
21st-century Ukrainian politicians
Independent politicians in Ukraine